Sticky content refers to content published on a website, which has the purpose of getting users to return to that particular website or hold their attention and get them to spend longer periods of time on this site. Webmasters use this method to build up a community of returning visitors to a website.

Examples are chat rooms, online forums, webmail, Internet games, weather, news and horoscopes.

Sticky content is also sometimes called sticky tools or sticky gear, and websites featuring sticky content are often referred to as sticky sites.

See also 
 Attention economy
 Clickbait

References 

Internet terminology
News media manipulation
Neologisms